"Build Your Kingdom Here" is a song performed by Northern Irish Christian folk rock worship band Rend Collective. The song was released as a single from their 2012 album Homemade Worship by Handmade People in 2013. The song peaked at No.12 on the US Hot Christian Songs chart.

Background 

"Build Your Kingdom Here" was released on 27 January 2012, as the second single from their second studio album Homemade Worship by Handmade People. Greg Fromholz directed the official video for the song, which has nearly 19 million views .

Charts

Weekly charts

Year-end charts

References 

2013 songs
2013 singles
Song articles with missing songwriters